The Esther Glen Award, or LIANZA Esther Glen Junior Fiction Award, is the longest running and the most renowned literary prize for New Zealand children's literature.

History 
The prize was called into being in memory of New Zealand writer Alice Esther Glen (1881–1940) who was the first notable author of children's books there. It has been awarded yearly (with some exceptions) since 1945 by the Library and Information Association of New Zealand Aotearoa (LIANZA) to a New Zealand author "for the most distinguished contribution to New Zealand literature for junior fiction".

Laureates 
 1945: Stella Morice, The Book of Wiremu
 1947: A. W. Reed, Myths and Legends of Maoriland
 1950: Joan Smith, The Adventures of Nimble, Rumble and Tumble
 1959: Maurice Duggan, Falter Tom and the Water Boy
 1964: Lesley C. Powell, Turi, The Story of a Little Boy
 1970: Margaret Mahy, A Lion in the Meadow
 1973: Margaret Mahy, The First Margaret Mahy Story Book
 1975: Eve Sutton and Lynley Dodd, My Cat Likes to Hide in Boxes
 1978: Ronda Armitage, The Lighthouse Keeper’s Lunch
 1979: Joan de Hamel, Take the Long Path
 1982: Katherine O’Brien, The Year of the Yelvertons
 1983: Margaret Mahy, The Haunting
 1984: Caroline Macdonald, Elephant Rock
 1985: Margaret Mahy, The Changeover
 1986: Maurice Gee, Motherstone
 1988: Tessa Duder, Alex
 1989: Jack Lasenby, The Mangrove Summer
 1990: Tessa Duder, Alex in Winter
 1991: William Taylor, Agnes the Sheep
 1992: Tessa Duder, Alessandra: Alex in Rome
 1993: Margaret Mahy, Underrunners
 1994: Paula Boock, Sasscat to Win
 1995: Maurice Gee, The Fat Man
 1996: Janice Marriott, Crossroads
 1997: Kate De Goldi, Sanctuary
 1998: David Hill, Fat, four-eyed and useless
 2001: Margaret Mahy, 24 Hours
 2002: Alison Robertson, Knocked For Six
 2003: David Hill, Right where it hurts
 2004: Ken Catran, Jacko Moran, sniper
 2005: Bernard Beckett, Malcolm and Juliet
 2006: Elizabeth Knox, Dreamhunter
 2007: Bernard Beckett, Genesis: A Novel
 2008: Mandy Hager, Smashed
 2009: Fleur Beale, Juno of Taris
 2010: Richard Newsome, The Billionaire’s Curse
 2011: Diana Menefy, Shadow of the Boyd
 2012: Barbara Else, The travelling restaurant
 2013: Rachael King, Red Rocks
 2014: Joy Cowley, Dunger
 2015: Leonie Agnew, Conrad Cooper's last stand
 2016: Kate De Goldi, From the Cutting Room of Barney Kettle
 2017: Tania Roxborogh, My New Zealand Story: Bastion Point
 2018: Bren MacDibble, How to Bee
 2019: Bren MacDibble, The Dog Runner
 2020: Weng Wai Chan, Lizard's Tale

See also 
 List of New Zealand literary awards

References

External links 
 LIANZA Esther Glen Junior Fiction Award 
 Esther Glen Award – with a list of prize winners
 The Esther Glen Award at NZHistory

New Zealand children's literary awards